Muna is the third studio album by American indie pop band Muna, released on June 24, 2022. It is their first album as an independent artist, after they signed with Phoebe Bridgers' Saddest Factory Records imprint in 2021. It was promoted by the singles "Silk Chiffon", "Anything but Me", "Kind of Girl", and "Home by Now". The album was met with critical acclaim upon release.

Background
In 2020, Muna was dropped by RCA Records, with which they had released their first two albums, and in May 2021 signed with Saddest Factory Records, an imprint of Dead Oceans owned by American singer-songwriter Phoebe Bridgers. Throughout 2021 and 2022, Muna toured with Bridgers on her Reunion Tour and with Kacey Musgraves on her Star-Crossed: Unveiled tour.

Muna will be primarily a synth-pop album, but according to lead singer Katie Gavin, "the sound of this record explodes in a ton of different directions". Guitarist Josette Maskin said of the album, "What ultimately keeps us together is knowing that someone's going to hear each one of these songs and use it to make a change they need in their life. That people are going to feel a kind of catharsis, even if it's a catharsis that I might never have known myself, because I'm fucked up."

Release and promotion
"Silk Chiffon", featuring vocals from Phoebe Bridgers, was released as the album's lead single on September 7, 2021. The song is an ode to queer love, and accompanied by a music video paying homage to the 1999 film But I'm a Cheerleader. The song was sent to adult alternative radio on September 27, 2021 and hot adult contemporary radio on March 21, 2022. Muna performed the song on The Late Late Show with James Corden on November 8, 2021.

On March 15, 2022, Muna announced the album and released the single "Anything but Me", a song about "leaving a partnership simply because it doesn’t feel right." The song was sent to adult alternative radio on March 28, 2022. Muna performed the song on The Ellen DeGeneres Show on April 18, 2022.

"Kind of Girl" was released as the third single from the album on April 28, 2022. The song "explores the power of language and the words we use to describe who we are and who we want to be." The music video features the trio dressed in as cowboys to express the fluidity of gender The fourth single, "Home by Now" was released on May 25, 2022.

The band will embark on a North American tour in support of the album, followed by nine dates in the UK.

Composition
Muna is primarily a synth-pop album influenced by new wave, disco, and hyperpop. "Silk Chiffon" and "Kind of Girl" are both country pop songs, with the former incorporating indie pop and bubblegum music, and the later interpolating Americana. "Anything but Me", "What I Want", and "Home by Now" are all electropop songs, with the latter fusing elements of dance music and emo. "Runner's High" is a disco song about self-care and grieving a break-up, with garage house-esque percussion and "hi-hats maintaining a staccato rhythm like a pattering heartbeat." "Solid" has a glam rock edge and "sparkles like the glitterball at an '80s prom". Album closer "Shooting Star" uses the titular phenomenon as a metaphor for destructive relationships, with "spacey synthesisers and underlying pulsating percussion that builds to coming-of-age-movie prog-rock guitar". Every song on the album begins with a quiet introduction that crescendos into the track, "gently easing the listener in rather than hitting them over the head".

Critical reception

MUNA was met with critical acclaim upon release. At Metacritic, which assigns a normalized rating out of 100 to reviews from mainstream critics, the album holds an average score of 82 based on thirteen reviews, indicating "universal acclaim".

The Line of Best Fit critic David Cobbald gave the album a perfect score, saying "MUNA is all killer no filler. From its overall sound down to its finer details, Gavin, Maskin and McPherson have hit the mark completely. It's amazing to see a band that are so unapologetically queer excel at their craft and create an album that is quite possibly, if not certainly, their masterpiece." Susan Darlington, writing for Loud & Quiet praised the album's overtones of "musical brightness and self-acceptance". David Roskin of Gigwise praised the release, saying "With a collection of bangers, slow tunes and refreshing melodies, MUNA are magic. They've created a space for all to lose themselves into for a little while, whether to dance or cry, they're here to carve through the monotony and troubles of daily life and transport us to a different, brighter, louder, prouder, and safer place." Ben Tipple of DIY writes "It's by far the happiest MUNA have sounded; a celebratory expression of queer love that loses none of the trio’s magic." Exclaim! contributor Dede Akomo wrote that the trio "emits a monstrous amount of something our world lacks: queer joy. Generation Z is no longer satisfied with simply seeing queer characters suffer in their media, and MUNA represent the counteraction to this anguish." In a five star review, Stephen Ackroyd of Dork called the album "A record that doesn't just thrill, but empowers too, it's enough to put MUNA firmly amongst the highest echelon of modern pop bands. Quite possibly the album of the year so far."

Track listing
All tracks written and produced by Muna, except where noted.

Personnel

Muna
Katie Gavin – lead vocals, background vocals, acoustic guitar, electric guitar, nylon-string guitar, tambourine, engineer, vocal engineer
Josette Maskin – lead guitar, acoustic guitar, electric guitar, slide guitar, Ebow, synthesizer, organ, background vocals, bass programming, drum programming, engineer
Naomi McPherson – rhythm guitar, acoustic guitar, 12-string guitar, mandolin, background vocals, synthesizer, synth-bass, drum programming, bass programming, vocal programming, string arrangements, engineer

Other musicians
Geo Botelho – bass, background vocals
Phoebe Bridgers – featured vocals
Luke Burgoyne – programming
Dan Grech-Marguerat – programming
Scott Heiner – drums
Charles Haydon Hicks – programming
Ryan Hommel – string arrangement
Joy Oladokun – saxophone, trumpet, horn arrangement
Cynthia Tolson – cello, violin, viola, string arrangement

Technical
Geo Botelho – additional engineer, vocal engineer
Luke Burgoyne – assistant mixing engineer
Dan Grech-Marguerat – mixing engineer
Charles Haydon Hicks – assistant mixing engineer
Patricia Sullivan – mastering engineer

Charts

References

2022 albums
Muna (band) albums
Dead Oceans albums
LGBT-related albums